Sinyongsan station is a station on the Seoul Subway Line 4 in Hangang-daero, Yongsan-gu, Seoul. Although not connected to this station by a transfer passageway, Yongsan station on Line 1 is a short walk away. The southwestern section of Yongsan Garrison can be accessed easily from this station. Its station subname is AMOREPACIFIC, and AMOREPACIFIC is located nearby.

Station layout

Neighborhood
Korail Yongsan station for KTX, ITX-Saemaeul, Mugunghwa-ho trains.

References

Railway stations in South Korea opened in 1985
Seoul Metropolitan Subway stations
Metro stations in Yongsan District